The 1986–87 Louisiana Tech Bulldogs basketball team represented Louisiana Tech University in Ruston, Louisiana as members of the Southland Conference during the 1986–87 season. The Bulldogs were led by head coach Tommy Joe Eagles. Louisiana Tech finished atop the Southland regular season standings (9–1) and would earn an automatic berth in the NCAA tournament by winning the conference tournament championship. The Bulldogs lost to No. 3 seed DePaul in the opening round.

Roster

Schedule and results

|-
!colspan=9 style=| Regular season

|-
!colspan=9 style=| Southland Conference tournament

|-
!colspan=9 style=| NCAA tournament

References

Louisiana Tech Bulldogs basketball seasons
Louisiana Tech
Louisiana Tech
1986 in sports in Louisiana
1987 in sports in Louisiana